Eliakim "E. P. Walton" Persons Walton (February 17, 1812 – December 19, 1890) was an American journalist, editor and politician. He served as a U.S. Representative from Vermont.

Biography

Walton was born in Montpelier, Vermont to Ezekiel Parker Walton and Prussia Persons. He attended the common schools and the Washington County, Vermont grammar school. He was apprenticed to a printer (publishing). He studied law under United States Senator Samuel Prentiss, a distant relative. Walton was admitted to the bar, but did not engage in the practice of law.

He was involved in journalism and was the editor of "Walton's Vermont Register". He lived in Essex, New York from 1826 until 1827, and edited and printed his first newspaper in Essex, titled "The Essex County Republican". Walton was the organizer and first president of the Editors and Publishers' Association, holding the office of president for more than twenty years. After the retirement of his father, Eliakim Parker Walton, in 1853, he was sole proprietor of the "Vermont Watchman" until 1868.

Walton was elected to the Vermont House of Representatives as a Whig in 1853. He was elected as a Republican candidate to the Thirty-fifth, Thirty-sixth, and Thirty-seventh Congresses, serving from March 4, 1857 until March 3, 1863. He declined to be a candidate for reelection and returned to his editorial and literary labors.

In 1864, he was a delegate to the Republican National Convention, and served as a member of the State constitutional convention in 1870. He served in the Vermont State Senate from 1874 and 1878, and was a trustee of the University of Vermont and of the Vermont State Agricultural College from 1875 until 1887. He served as president of the Vermont Historical Society from 1876 until 1890. He edited Volume II of the "Collections of the Vermont Historical Society", including the Haldimand Negotiations papers, and edited eight volumes of "Records of the Governor and Council."

Personal life
Walton married Sarah Sophia Howes. Following Sarah's death, he married Clara P. Snell Field.

Death
Walton died on December 19, 1890 in Montpelier, Vermont. He is interred in Green Mount Cemetery in Montpelier.

References

External links 
 
 Biographical Directory of the United States Congress
 Govtrack.us
 The Political Graveyard
 
 Vermont Civil War

1812 births
1890 deaths
People from Montpelier, Vermont
Vermont Whigs
Members of the Vermont House of Representatives
Republican Party members of the United States House of Representatives from Vermont
19th-century American politicians
Burials at Green Mount Cemetery (Montpelier, Vermont)